The Bodaruwitj, also rendered Bedaruwidj or Potaruwutj, and referred to in some early sources as the Tatiara, are an Aboriginal Australian people of the state of South Australia. David Horton believed they were the group his sources referred to as the Bindjali people. Austlang refers to Bindjali / Bodaruwitj as alternative names for the same language.

Name
Potaruwutj  is an autonym, meaning in their language, "wandering" (-wutj is a suffix meaning "man"), referring to their continuous shifting of their campsites throughout the mallee scrubland.

Language

The name of their language, or of the version spoken around the Padthaway district, was Yaran, though it is also now known as Bindjali.  William Haynes, an earlier resident of the area, provided E.M.Curr with two distinct vocabularies of the area, which he designated as that of the Tatiara. Norman Tindale compiled a word-list relying on information supplied to him by Milerum, whose mother Lakwunami was a Potaruwutj from the Keilira region. R.M: Dixon managed to elicit a vocabulary of Bindjali from a Bordertown informant, Bertie Pinkie, as late as 1973. In his classification, Polinjunga, one of the alternative names for the Bodaruwitj, or a clan name of the same, is listed as a dialect of the Bungandidj-Kuurn Kopan Noot subgroup of the Kulinic languages.

Country
Relying on two informants, Clarence Long (Milerum) and Alf Watson, Tindale estimated that the Potaruwutj's lands covered , extending westwards from Naracoorte down to within the third inland dune range of the Coorong area, some 10 miles from the coastline. The northern reaches touched Tatiara. It included Bordertown, Wirrega, and Keith.

Ecologically, Potaruwutj territory was less fertile and suffered from lower rainfall than neighbouring areas. The Ngarkat foraged to their north, with the Potaruwutj also present south of the main belt of mallee where the Ngarkat predominated. Like the Tanganekald and Jarildekald, the Potaruwutj marked out their territory with stones or cairns. The Potaruwutj clans, following a usage shared by these two tribes, named the major features of their territory by a name that referred to a distinctive characteristic of the zone, suffixed with a word like -injeri (belonging to) or -orn (an abbreviation of the word for "man"] attached to
denote the area possessed. The suffix -injeri had the meaning of "belonging to" while -orn is said to be a contraction of korn meaning man or person,

Social organisation
According to William Haynes, writing about the Tatiara in 1887, their numbers were thought to have amounted to some 500 at the beginning of white settlement, but only scattered remnants of the several distinct groups had survived within a few decades, and knowledge of them is fragmentary.
At least five clans are known to have constituted the Potaruwutj group:
 Coolucooluk (horde name)
 Wirigirek (to the north. Cf. the toponym Wirrega, a place name)
 Tatiara (toponym)
 Polinjunga
 Kangarabalak

They practised neither circumcision nor ritual avulsion of the front teeth.

History of contact
According to material gathered by Ronald and Catherine Berndt, as large number of Tatiara were killed at Piwingang near Tailem Bend after the former in a raid on a Ngarrindjeri camp. The affected group had too few warriors to retaliate and went south to organise a retaliatory hunt among several different groups. The large band of warriors managed to track the Tatiara down at Piwingang and only few survived the onslaught. Notwithstanding traditions that the Tatiara and Yaraldi did not intermarry, records indicate that intermarriage did take place between them and the Yaraldi Piltindjeri clan.

A Scottish businessman and immigrant, Robert Lawson, established a pastoral station on Bodaruwitj territory near Padthaway, and in later reports called the Indigenous people of that district the Coolucooluck, but also Padthaway. He defined these Coolucooluck as denizens of the area between Salt Creek, Galt's Station and Padthaway.

Culture
The Bodaruwitj (Tatiara) men had a repute among other tribes, including the Yaraldi, for being well-endowed and having strong sexual appetites, just as native outsiders attributed to their women large labia majora. Some of this is reflected in a number of recorded songs.

The pelekaw song form is one in southeastern South Australia that makes a defiant accusation in the expectation it will be challenged. One notable case concerned the rules of exogamous exchange regarding women. A dispute with the Coorong lagoon Tanganekeld, whom the Potaruwutj called Tenggi, arose when the Tatiara Wepulprap clan of the Potaruwutj suspected the women they gave to the former were maltreated and subject to the sorcery of lethal bone-pointing. The reality was one of resentment over a perceived break-down in one-on-one exchanges arising from women being sent to the wrong, rather than the right, clan they were contracted to marry into.

A Potaruwutj big man with a repute for powerful magic, Dongaganinj, composed a pelekaw refrain which articulated these feelings of grievance.

The neighbouring Meintangk, who sided with the Tanganekeld, on hearing this rude insinuation, composed a slanderous weritjinj variant on the pelekaw song which both slandered the Potaruwutj and challenged them to battle at the traditional combat grounds at Nunukapul (Telauri Flat) near Marcollat station. This song, chanted while men danced imitating their enemies coupling with dogs, rang:

A resolutive battle was arranged, and seven warriors were left dead on the Nunukapul field.

The Tanganekeld then took up the challenges, and composed a song:

Weritjamini was another influential Potaruwutj headman, associated with Dongaganinj. In this region's lore, the spirit, powoqko, was, on death, believed to travel northwest and cross over the sea to dwell on the island of Karta, and the implications of the original language were so abusive that the two groups would not intermarry for another two generations.

Alternative names

 Bindjali
 Bunyalli
 Cangarabaluk
 Coolucooluk
 Dadiera
 Djadjala
 Jaran (language name)
 Kangarabalak (of the Tanganekald, kangara meant "east"+balak, "people.")
 Padthaway tribe
 Polenjunga
 Polinjunga
 Potangola
 Potaruwutj/Potaruwutji
 Tatiara (toponym)
 Tattayarra, Tatiarra
 Tyattyalla
 Tyatyalli
 Tyedduwurrung
 Tyeddyuwurru
 Wepulprap.(an exonym meaning "southern people" in Tanganekald)
 Wereka
 Wereka-tyalli
 Werekarait
 Wergaia
 Wimmera
 Wirigirek (a northern horde; Wirrega, a place name)
 Wirrega
 Woychibirik
 Wra-gar-ite (see Marditjali)
 Yaran

Some words

 kadleira eared Otaria seal
 kal/kaal tame dog.
 maranipo/wrakan Red wattlebird
 mingka wedge-tailed eagle.
 pirit Noisy miner.
 teriterit willy wagtail.
 tuwul white-backed magpie (Gymnorhina tibicen)
 weirintj (whale). This Bodaruwitj term lies behind the indigenous term for the area of Rivoli Bay, namely Weirintjam/Wilitjam.
 wereka (no)
 wilkra wild dog
 wutj (man)

Notes

Citations

Sources

Aboriginal peoples of South Australia